Nano Research is a peer-reviewed scientific journal published by Springer Science+Business Media. It covers research in all areas of nanotechnology.

External links 
 

Springer Science+Business Media academic journals
Monthly journals
Publications established in 2008
Nanotechnology journals
English-language journals